Dmitri Yashin may refer to:
 Dmitri Yashin (footballer, born 1981), Russian footballer
 Dmitri Yashin (footballer, born 1993), Russian footballer